The Horti Domitiae were a set of private gardens in ancient Rome, belonging to Domitia Longina, wife of the emperor Domitian. They were sited on the right bank of the river Tiber. A few years later the Mausoleum of Hadrian was built in the same area. The gardens were still known by this name in the time of Aurelian.

See also
Roman gardens

Bibliography
'Horti', in Platner and Ashby, A Topographical Dictionary of Ancient Rome, London, 1929, pp. 267

Domitia
Building projects of the Flavian dynasty